Brendan Neilson (born 5 April 1978) was a New Zealand-Japanese rugby union who played as a Centre in Japan for Coca-Cola Red Sparks, NEC Green Rockets and Kamaishi Seawaves. He studied in Japan at Sendai Ikuei High School, then Ryutsu Keizai University. On graduation he first joined NEC Green Rockets. He has a bachelor's degree in tourism and social studies.

In 2006, he obtained Japanese citizenship, though at international level he has yet to represent the senior Japan squad, having played for the Japan A and Under-23 sides.

In April 2015 he began working as IBDP World History Instructor & Rugby Head Coach at Sendai Ikuei High School and is still currently there.

Notes

Japanese rugby union players
Green Rockets Tokatsu players
Coca-Cola Red Sparks players
New Zealand emigrants to Japan
Naturalized citizens of Japan
1978 births
Living people
People from Auckland
Sportspeople from Auckland
Rugby union players from Auckland
Expatriate rugby union players in Japan
New Zealand expatriate rugby union players
New Zealand expatriate sportspeople in Japan
Rugby union centres